Above and Beyoncé: Video Collection & Dance Mixes is a remix and video album by American singer Beyoncé. It was released on June 16, 2009 through Columbia Records and Music World Entertainment exclusively to Walmart and J&R, although it was later made available through other retailers. Consisting of two discs, the album features music videos on one disc and dance remixes on the other. Above and Beyoncé: Video Collection & Dance Mixes peaked at number thirty-five on the US Billboard 200, and received generally favorable reviews from music critics. It also appeared on US Billboard component charts, Top R&B/Hip-Hop Albums and Dance/Electronic Albums. The remix version of "Ego" included on the album, featuring Kanye West, was nominated for Grammy Award for Best Rap/Sung Collaboration at the 52nd Annual Grammy Awards (2010).

Background and content
Above and Beyoncé comprises two discs. The first contains the music videos of six of the singles from her 2008 studio album, I Am... Sasha Fierce: "If I Were a Boy", "Single Ladies (Put a Ring on It)", "Diva", "Halo", Broken-Hearted Girl" and "Ego". It also features a "fan exclusive" cut of the "Ego" video and behind-the-scenes footage of the shooting of the videos. The second disc hosts electronica dance remixes of the songs, as well as of the album's sixth single, "Sweet Dreams". A mix of "Ego" with a rap verse from Kanye West closes the album.

Release and artwork
On June 15, 2009, the behind-the-scenes footage was broadcast on BET's Access Granted. The remix video for "Ego" premiered afterwards. The cover art of Above and Beyoncé was previewed by People magazine in May 2009. The album was originally released exclusively to Walmart and J&R, on June 16, 2009. The dance mixes only were made available via MP3 format through Amazon Music the same day, and the whole album was released to the online store on November 3, 2009. The iTunes Store began selling the remixes on February 1, 2010.

Critical reception

AllMusic's Andy Kellman called the album "a nice set for devoted fans who haven't already shelled out for all the mixes", and awarded it three out of five stars. In 2011, Maura Gavaghan, writing for MTV, said: "The creative title of this video album alone is a reason for every devoted fan... to buy a copy". She added that the dance remixes of the songs make a "dance party in a neatly packaged DVD set".

Commercial performance
Above and Beyoncé: Video Collection & Dance Mixes debuted at number thirty-six on the US Billboard 200 chart dated July 4, 2009, selling 14,000 copies that week. It later peaked at number thirty-five, spending fourteen weeks on the chart. On the US Top R&B/Hip-Hop Albums, Above and Beyoncé: Video Collection & Dance Mixes debuted and peaked at number twenty-three, spending forty-three weeks on the chart. Among the US Dance/Electronic Albums, the album debuted at number two, placing below Lady Gaga's debut studio album The Fame (2008). It spent a total of forty-eight weeks on the chart, including twenty-four weeks in the top ten.
Above and Beyoncé: Video Collection & Dance Mixes was ranked at number nine on the year-end US Dance/Electronic Albums for 2009, and at number twenty-one for 2010.

Track listing

Notes
 – denotes a remixer.

Personnel
Credits adapted from AllMusic and Above and Beyoncé: Video Collection & Dance Mixess liner notes.

Kory Aaron – assistance
Damien Alexander – artists and repertoire
Phillip Andelman – direction
Dave Audé – production, remixing
Babyface – writing
Christian Baker – assistance
Bangladesh – writing
Tim Blacksmith – management
E. Kidd Bogart – writing
Ed Burke – direction
Domenic Capello – mixing
Jim Caruana – engineering, vocal engineering
Fusako Chubachi – art direction
Tony Coluccio – remixing
Tom Coyne – mastering
James Cruz – mastering
Kim Dellara – executive production
DJ Escape – remixing
The-Dream – writing
Mikkel Storleer Eriksen – engineering, instrumentation, writing
Jens Gad – drums
Toby Gad – arrangement, engineering, production, instrumentation, writing
Tim Gant – keyboards
Sean Garrett – writing
Alan Gordon – engineering
Matt Green – assistance
Kuk Harrell – engineering, writing
Matt Hennessy – engineering
Ty Hunter – stylist
Jim Jonsin – production
Maurice Joshua – remixing
Grant Jue – production
Chris Kantrowitz – executive production
Anthony Kilhoffer – vocal engineering
Kimberly Kimble – hair stylist
Juli Knapp – artists and repertoire
Beyoncé – executive production, production, writing, vocals vocal production
Mathew Knowles – executive production
Tina Knowles – creative consultant
Melissa Larsen – production
Harold Lilly – production, writing
Peter Lindbergh – photography
Rico Love – producer, writing, vocals, vocal production
Philip Margiziotis – horn
Melina Matsoukas – direction
Jake McKim – artists and repertoire
Michael Paul Miller – assistance
Sophie Muller – director
Jake Nava – director
Jeff Pantaleo – executive production
Dave Pensado – mixing
Jim Jonsin – writing
Hagai Shaham – production
Mark "Spike" Stent – mixing
Tricky Stewart – writing
Ryan Tedder – arrangement, engineering, instrumentation, production, writing
Francesca Tolot – make-up
Lidell Townsell – keyboards
Jennifer Turner – marketing
Randy Urbanski – assistance
Miles Walker – engineering
Wayne Wilkins – production, writing
Blac Elvis – writing
Dontae Winslow – trumpet
John Winter – production
Andrew Wuepper – assistance

Charts

Weekly charts

Year-end charts

Release history

References

Beyoncé video albums
Beyoncé albums
2009 video albums
2009 remix albums
Music video compilation albums
Remix EPs
Columbia Records remix albums
Columbia Records video albums
Albums produced by Beyoncé